Jelena Antić (born 17 June 1991) is a Macedonian professional basketball player. She played for Namur Capitale , Ludovika-FCSM Csata , Wisła Can-Pack Kraków, Lulea Basket, Alba Iulia, Maccabi Ashdod, Zkk Partizan, Vardar Mladinec, Liberty Flames Partizan, Radivoj Korać.

References

External links
 Profile at eurobasket.com

1991 births
Living people
Sportspeople from Skopje
Macedonian women's basketball players
Macedonian people of Serbian descent
Small forwards
ŽKK Partizan players
ŽKK Radivoj Korać players
Macedonian expatriate basketball people in Serbia
Macedonian expatriate basketball people in Israel
Macedonian expatriate basketball people in Spain 
Macedonian expatriate basketball people in Poland
Macedonian expatriate basketball people in Romania